"Progressive" is Kalafina's sixth single. It is their first single which has no tie-in.

Track listing

CD

DVD

Charts

References

2009 singles
Songs written by Yuki Kajiura
Kalafina songs
2009 songs